Eberhart is both a surname and a given name. Notable people with the name include:

Surname:
Adolph Olson Eberhart (1870-1944), American politician
Mark Eberhart, American chemist and author
Meredith J. Eberhart, American hiker
Mignon G. Eberhart (1899-1996), American author
Ralph Eberhart (born 1946), United States Air Force general 
Richard Eberhart (1904-2005), American poet
Russell C. Eberhart, American electrical engineer
Sean Eberhart (born 1966), American politician

Given name:
Eberhart Jensen (1922–2003), Norwegian astrophysicist

Fictional characters:
Joanna Eberhart, protagonist of the novel The Stepford Wives and the two film adaptations

See also
Eberhart Steel Products Company of Buffalo, New York, United States
Eberhard
Eberhardt

Surnames from given names